Yuliya Vladimirovna Chekalyova (also romanized Yulia Tchekaleva, born 6 February 1984) is a Russian cross-country skier who competed between 2005 and 2018.

Career
Her best World Cup finish was 11th in a 15 km event in Russia in 2007.

At the FIS Nordic World Ski Championships 2007 in Sapporo, she finished 16th in the 10 km and 22nd in the 30 km events.

Chekalyova is married to Alexey Kuritsyn, with whom she has a son, Matvey, born in 2012.

On 1 December 2017 she was disqualified from the 2014 Winter Olympics, her results (including sixth place in the relay) were annulled, and she was banned for life from the Olympic games as a result of a positive doping test.

Cross-country skiing results
All results are sourced from the International Ski Federation (FIS).

Olympic Games

World Championships
 2 medals – (2 bronze)

World Cup

Individual podiums
4 podiums – (3 , 1 )

Team podiums
 2 podiums – (2 )

References

External links

 
 
 
 

1984 births
Living people
Russian female cross-country skiers
Olympic cross-country skiers of Russia
Cross-country skiers at the 2014 Winter Olympics
FIS Nordic World Ski Championships medalists in cross-country skiing
Universiade medalists in cross-country skiing
Universiade silver medalists for Russia
Competitors at the 2009 Winter Universiade
Tour de Ski skiers
People from Vologda
Russian sportspeople in doping cases
Doping cases in cross-country skiing
Sportspeople from Vologda
21st-century Russian women